Marcato is an Italian surname. Notable people with the surname include:

Andrea Marcato (born 1983), Italian rugby union player and coach
Marco Marcato (born 1984), Italian cyclist
Robert Marcato (born 1983), American actor

Italian-language surnames